Malham Tarn Estate is a National Trust property in North Yorkshire, England.

The estate is located in the Pennines and lies between Wharfedale and Ribblesdale. The majority of the land is used by six holdings who operate based on agricultural tenancies and grazing licences for cows and sheep.

Malham Tarn, a glacial lake just outside Malham, along with the surrounding wetlands were given National Nature Reserve status in 1992. Under the Ramsar Convention it was declared a wetland of international importance in 1993. The Tarn is home to perch and brown trout, with fly fishing of the trout allowed with a daily pass.

The property consists of six farms and a National Nature Reserve around Malham Tarn.

References

External links
Malham Tarn and Moor - information at the National Trust

National Trust properties in North Yorkshire
Nature reserves in North Yorkshire